Air trapping, also called gas trapping, is an abnormal retention of air in the lungs where it is difficult to exhale completely.  It is observed in obstructive lung diseases such as asthma, bronchiolitis obliterans syndrome and chronic obstructive pulmonary diseases such as emphysema and chronic bronchitis.

Air trapping is not a diagnosis but is a presentation of an illness, and can be a guide to the appropriate differential diagnosis.


Imaging
On high resolution CT air trapping has a typical imaging appearance, although often evaluation with both maximum inhalation and exhalation, or inspiratory and expiratory views, are needed for a more specific diagnosis. One of its typical imaging patterns is mosaic attenuation. In the classic presentation, the lung will appear normal at inspiration, but on exhalation, the diseased portions of the lung which have lost connective tissue recoil will remain lucent while the healthy portions of the lung will become more dense due to atelectasis. This helps distinguish it from mosaic attenuation due to patchy fibrosis, as occurs with nonspecific interstitial pneumonia, and in early usual interstitial pneumonitis (the hallmark imaging diagnosis of interstitial lung disease) in which there is no change with inspiration and expiration.

Measurement and function
Exhaled volumes are measured by a pulmonary function test or simple spirometry, leading to an elevated residual volume and a measurement of forced expiratory volume. Air trapping is often incidentally diagnosed on computed tomography (CT) scanning.  On expiratory films, retained hyperlucent gas will be visualised in cases of air trapping.

Air trapping represents poorly aerated lung, but on its own is clinically benign. It is a common problem for smokers who dive. On diving the lung volume collapses and pushes air into the poorly aerated regions. On arising from a deep depth, these air-trapped areas of lung expand. This places great pressure on the lung tissue which can rupture.

References

Respiratory diseases